The IAR 79 was a twin-engine bomber and military reconnaissance aircraft with a wood and metal structure that saw service in World War II  built under licence in Brasov, Romania, by Industria Aeronautică Română

Development

In May 1937, Romania ordered 24 Savoia-Marchetti SM.79B bombers powered by two Romanian-built IAR K14 engines. This variant was designated SM-79B and equipped the 1st Bomber Group (71st and 72nd Bomber Squadron).

Second batch of aircraft were upgraded by replacing the IAR K14 engines with 1200 hp water cooled Junkers Jumo 211Da engines increasing the maximum speed from 350 km/h to 405 km/h. Eight of these new airplanes were ordered in Italy. They were designated JIS-79B (Jumo Italian S-79B). But they didn't arrive until August 1941. An additional 36 aircraft were license built in IAR factory in Brasov under designation IAR 79 JR (Jumo Român).

In the autumn of 1942 another order of 36 bombers was issued to the IAR factory. They were upgraded by replacing the Junkers Jumo 211Da engine with new Junkers Jumo 211F,a 1400 HP engine.

Design
The IAR.79 was a cantilever low-wing monoplane bimotor, with a retractable taildragger undercarriage. The fuselage of the IAR.79 was made of a welded tubular steel frame and covered with duralumin in the forward section, duralumin and plywood on the upper fuselage surface, and fabric on all other surfaces  The wings were of all-wood construction, with the trailing edge flaps and leading edge slats (Handley-Page type) to offset its relatively small size. The internal structure was made of three spars, linked with cantilevers and a skin of plywood. The wing had a dihedral of 2° 15'. Ailerons were capable of rotating through +13/-26°, and were used together with the flaps in low-speed flight and in takeoff.
Its capabilities were significantly greater than its predecessor, the SM.79, with over  available and a high wing loading that gave it characteristics not dissimilar to a large fighter.
The engines fitted to the main bomber version were two  IAR K14 radials, equipped with variable-pitch, all-metal three-bladed propellers. With full power available and flaps set for takeoff, the SM.79 could be airborne within .

Variants

S-79B
Romanian designation of the Savoia-Marchetti SM.79B bombers with 2 x IAR K14 1000 HP engine. Italian Built
JIS-79B
Romanian designation of the Savoia-Marchetti SM.79B bombers with 2 x Junkers Jumo 211Da 1200 HP engine, The aircraft made were Italian-built.
IAR JRS-79B
Romanian designation of the IAR 79 with 2 x Junkers Jumo 211Da  1200 HP engine, built under license by IAR factory. A total of 36 were manufactured by the Romanian factory (numbered 101-136). 
IAR JRS-79B1
Romanian designation of the IAR 79 with 2 x Junkers Jumo 211F 1400 HP engine, built by IAR factory. A total of 36 were manufactured by the Romanian factory (numbered 201-236).

Operational service

Initial in 1938 S-79Bs equipped the 1st Bomber Group (71st and 72nd Bomber Squadron). In July 1941, one of the 2nd Bomber Group's squadrons, the 75th Bomber Squadron, was re-equipped with new JRS-79B, These went on to fight in the battle of Odessa. In 1942 newer JIS-79Bs were assigned to the 71st Squadron. The 72nd Squadron was re-equipped with JRS-79B. The remaining older S-79Bs were transferred to flying schools. In 1944 the 2nd Bomber Group (82nd and 83rd Squadron) was re-equipped with IAR JRS-79B1. In October 1944 the 1st Bomber Group was reorganized (72nd and 82nd Squadron) and sent to the front. This unit fought on until the end of the war in May 1945.

Operators

Royal Romanian Air Force

Specifications (IAR JRS-79B1)

References

External links 
 The I.A.R.79 in WW2 on worldwar2.ro  (with foto)

79
1930s Romanian military reconnaissance aircraft
1930s Romanian bomber aircraft
World War II medium bombers
World War II Romanian reconnaissance aircraft
Aircraft first flown in 1937